William Cowper Brann (January 4, 1855 – April 1, 1898) was an American journalist also known as Brann the Iconoclast.

Early life 
The son of Presbyterian minister Noble J. Brann, he was born in Humboldt, Illinois. When his mother died in 1857, he was sent by his father to live with William and Mary Hawkins, where he stayed until 1868. That year, he ran away from home and took odd jobs in several cities, including working as a painter's helper, a bellboy at a hotel, manager of an opera company, a pitcher in semiprofessional baseball, and a fireman and brakeman on a locomotive.

A job in a print shop turned Brann's interest toward journalism, and he became a cub reporter. As his career progressed, he worked in St. Louis, Galveston, Houston, and San Antonio. While in Rochelle, Illinois in 1877, he married Carrie Belle Martin, with whom he had one son and two daughters.

Career
During the 1880s Brann became to take his career in journalism seriously and traveled around the country working for several significant newspapers, including the St. Louis Globe Democrat, the Galveston Evening Tribune, and the Galveston News. At the same time, Brann registered three plays with the Library of Congress: Cleon, That American Woman, and Retribution. Despite his growing success, Brann's family was shaken by the suicide of his twelve-year-old daughter Inez in 1890, which greatly agonized Brann. Brann coped with this tragedy, and was inspired to continue to strive towards a successful career in writing and journalism.

In 1891, only one year after his daughter's death, Brann moved to Austin, Texas to write for the Austin Statesman. After only a short time, however, he decided to attempt to write his own paper, and invested a significant chunk of his personal savings into the Iconoclast. That paper quickly failed, and Brann went back to working for other Texas newspapers, the San Antonio Express and the Houston Post.

Waco Iconoclast
In 1894 Brann moved to Waco, Texas, to become an editor with the Waco Daily News. By February 1895 he had decided to attempt to revive the Iconoclast, and this time the paper was successful, with a circulation nearing 100,000 people. With this new platform to communicate his views, Brann quickly became known for his stinging, often hateful attacks on various groups that drew his ire, including Baptists, Episcopalians, the British, blacks, and Baylor University. Brann attacked perceived hypocrisy from the Baptists with his seething prose, saying "I have nothing against the Baptists. I just believe they were not held under long enough". He devoted many paragraphs to his hatred of the wealthy eastern social elites, such as the Vanderbilt family, and deplored their marriages to titled Europeans. He characterized such marriages as diluting the elites' already-debased American stock with worthless foreign blood. He was equally critical of the New York social scene.

Baylor University, the prominent Baptist institution in Waco, drew constant criticism from Brann. He set off a scandal with allegations that Baylor President Rufus Burleson's son-in-law's brother Steen Morris, who lived with the Burleson family, had impregnated a student from Brazil. He alleged that male faculty members were having sexual relations with female students and any father sending his daughter to Baylor would be risking her rape. In Brann's view Baylor was, as he published, "A factory for the manufacture of ministers and magdalenes." Brann's constant attacks on the university enraged many of its supporters, and, on October 2, 1897, he was kidnapped by Baylor students who demanded that he retract his statements. Four days later, Brann was beaten by three men, including a local Baptist judge, who were angry that he had not left town.

Legacy and death
On April 1, 1898, Brann was walking alone on Waco's Fourth Street when he was shot in the back by Tom Davis, a Baylor supporter whose daughter was a student at the University. After being shot, Brann turned, drew his pistol, and fired multiple shots at Davis, who fell, mortally wounded, in the doorway of the Jake French Cigar Store. Brann was shot through the left lung with the bullet exiting his chest. He was forced to walk to the city jail but later escorted home by friends. Both Davis and Brann died the next day. Brann is buried in Oakwood Cemetery, Waco. Engraved on Brann's monument is the word TRUTH, and beneath it is a profile of Brann with a bullet hole in it. Brann remains a controversial figure to this day.

Personal life
Brann married Carrie Belle Martin on March 3, 1877, in Rochelle, Illinois. They had three children. Their daughter, Inez, died at age 12 following a confrontation with her father regarding the attentions of a young boy who left flowers at the house for Inez, whom Brann accused of encouraging the boy's interest. Her denial led him to accuse her of lying. The next morning, her mother and father found her dead after she had taken morphine. She left a note that said, in part, "I don’t want to live. I could never be as good as you want me to.”

Papers
Brann's papers are housed at the Harry Ransom Center of The University of Texas at Austin.

Works

 The Complete Works of Brann the Iconoclast. New York: Brann Publishers, 1919. 
Vol. 1 | Vol. 2 | Vol. 3 | Vol. 4 | Vol. 5 | Vol. 6 | Vol. 7 | Vol. 8 | Vol. 9 | Vol. 10 | Vol. 11 | Vol. 12

Further reading 

 Charles Carver, Brann the Iconoclast. Austin, TX: University of Texas Press, 1957.
 Jerry Flemmons. Oh Dammit!: A Lexicon and Lecture from William Cowper Brann, the Iconoclast. Lubbock, TX: Texas Tech University Press, 1998.
 Edward G. Fletcher and Jack L. Hart, Brann the Playwright. Austin, TX: University of Texas, 1941.
 Susan Nelle Gregg, Waco's Apostle. M.A. thesis. University of Texas at Austin, 1986.
 Cathy Howard, "Brann's Iconoclast and the Fight Against Baylor University," Texas Historian, September 1980. 
 Andy Kopplin, "W. C. Brann, a Texas Iconoclast," Texas Historian, May 1981. 
 Gary Cleve Wilson, "Bane of the Baptists," Texas Monthly, vol. 14, no. 1 (Jan. 1986), pg. 122.

See also
 List of journalists killed in the United States
 Censorship in the United States
 Rufus Columbus Burleson

References

External links 

  "William Cowper Brann" in the Handbook of Texas Online
 "The Iconoclast's Icon" by Dave Shiflett, October 1, 2004
 William Cowper Brann Collection at the Harry Ransom Center at the University of Texas at Austin
 Baylor University's description of its Willam Cowper Brann Collection A careful and honest appraisal by Baylor of its great critic, and his charges.
 
 
 

1855 births
1898 deaths
Baylor University people
Journalists from Illinois
Assassinated American journalists
Burials at Oakwood Cemetery (Waco, Texas)
Deaths by firearm in Texas
Journalists from Texas
19th-century American newspaper publishers (people)
19th-century American newspaper editors
Editors of Texas newspapers
Journalists killed in the United States
American male journalists
19th-century American male writers